Metaleptina is a genus of moths of the family Nolidae. The genus was erected by William Jacob Holland in 1893.

Species
 Metaleptina albibasis Holland, 1893
 Metaleptina albicosta Berio, 1964
 Metaleptina albilinea Hampson, 1912
 Metaleptina andriavolo Viette, 1976
 Metaleptina coronata Berio, 1964
 Metaleptina digramma (Hampson, 1905)
 Metaleptina dileuca Hampson, 1912
 Metaleptina geminastra (Hampson, 1905)
 Metaleptina microcyma (Hampson, 1905)
 Metaleptina nigribasis Holland, 1893
 Metaleptina obliterata Holland, 1893
 Metaleptina sarice (Viette, 1981)
 Metaleptina serrulinea Bryk, 1913
 Metaleptina simplex Berio, 1964
 Metaleptina subnigra Berio, 1964

References

Chloephorinae